Gladys Rodríguez (born June 4, 1943) is a Puerto Rican actress, comedian, and television host.

Early years
Rodríguez was born in Santurce, San Juan, Puerto Rico. She and her parents moved to New York City when she was still a child. In New York, she received her primary and secondary education. When she was eight years old she attended the Children's Hour Academy where she learned tap dancing, drama and ballet.

In 1960, Rodríguez returned to Puerto Rico where she took drama classes under the guidance of Edmundo Rivera Alvarez. She enrolled in the University of Puerto Rico and earned a degree in Dramatic Arts.

Career

Television
Rodríguez made her television debut when she auditioned for a role in the soap opera La Mujer de Aquella Noche (The Woman of That Night) and performed alongside Braulio Castillo. The soap opera was a success and her acting caught the attention of a Peruvian director who offered her a role in the soap opera Simplemente María-2da. Parte (Simply Mary-Part 2), filmed in Peru.  Simplemente María Part 2, became an international success, in Latin America.

She was inactive during the early 1970s, however in 1975 Puerto Rican television producer Tommy Muñiz offered Rodríguez to play the role of his "wife" in the situation comedy Los García.  The show became very popular and is the longest running series in Puerto Rican television history, considered by many to be a Puerto Rican classic. During that period she also performed the leading roles in the soap operas: Marta Llorens with Raúl Juliá and Juan José Camero, Fue sin Querer (It Wasn't on Purpose) with Sandro de América, Verano Rojo (Red Summer) with Rogelio Guerra and Viernes Social (Social Friday) with Arnaldo André, among others. In 2006, she performed a supporting actress role in Telemundo's soap opera Dueña y Señora, starring  Karla Monroig.

Rodríguez worked on the post-production stages as actress and Production Designer of the TV mini-series El Regalo which was released in 2006.

In 2007 she hosted a morning talk show Entre Nosotras (Among Us) with Alba Nydia Díaz, among other celebrities.

Theater
Rodríguez began her theater acting career by acting in the following productions: Un Tranvía llamado Deseo (A Streetcar Named Desire) and Los Soles Truncos (Fanlights) alongside Esther Sandoval, Muerte en el Nilo (Death on the Nile), Palacio de Carton (Cardboard Palace), La Enemiga (The Enemy), El Búho y la gatita (The Owl and the Pussycat), El mismo año a la misma hora (The same year at the same time) and many other more. In the 1990s she starred as Anna in the San Juan production of The King and I, and as the Mother Superior in the San Juan premiere of Sor-Presas (Nunsense). Other productions include Flor de Presidio (1989) and Steel Magnolias.

She belonged to an association of Puerto Rican actresses called MECA, which produced for television programs such as Ellas al Mediodía. Later she joined actresses, Ángela Meyer, Camille Carrion and Marilyn Pupo in the TV program called Ahora (Now).

Feature films
Rodríguez's first featured movie was the 1979 comedy Dios los cria, playing Annette. Then came the 1982 musical comedy Una Aventura Llamada Menudo alongside Puerto Rican boy band Menudo and Mexican teen actress Alondra. In this film, Rodriguez played matriarchal character Señora Mía. This was followed by the 1989 film Lo que le paso a Santiago (What Happened to Santiago), produced by Pedro Muñiz and written and directed by Jacobo Morales. Lo que le paso a Santiago was nominated for an Oscar in 1989 in the category of Best Foreign Language Film.

Filmography
 Lamento Borincano - uncredited
 Los Expatriados (1964) - uncredited
 Un Largo viaje hacia la muerte (1968) - uncredited
 Dios los cría (And God Created Them) (1979) - Annette
 Una Aventura llamada Menudo (An Adventure Called Menudo) (1982) - Señora Mía
 Cuentos de Don Abelardo
 Lo que le Pasó a Santiago (1989) - Angelina
 Posada Corazon (Novela) (1990)
 El Poder del Shakti (1995)
 Desvío al paraíso (Shortcut to Paradise) (1994) - Lona
 La Guagua aérea (Air Bus) (1995)
 Milagro en Yauco (Miracle in Yauco) (1995)
 Amores como todos los demas (1999) (TV) - Yolanda
 Amores (2004) TV Mini-series (2003) - Seda Blanca
 El Sueño del regreso (2005) - Carlotta
 El Regalo (2006) TV Mini-series -  Elizabeth
 The Caller (2011) - Mrs. Guidi

In 1999, she participated in the theater production of La Carreta (The Oxcart) by Rene Marques. That same year, she authored her first book, Aliup, in which she discusses her strong Christian beliefs. On March 15, 2002, she acted in the theater production of Mujeres de la Biblia (Women of the Bible), which was initially presented in the Tapia Theater of San Juan. The production's success in over 60 continuous presentations led the producers to present it outside of Puerto Rico to places like the United States.

See also

List of Puerto Ricans
Lo que le Pasó a Santiago
Braulio Castillo
Alba Nydia Díaz
Karla Monroig
History of women in Puerto Rico

References

External links

1943 births
Living people
Actresses from San Juan, Puerto Rico
Puerto Rican soap opera actresses
Puerto Rican writers
Puerto Rican comedians
Puerto Rican film actresses
Puerto Rican stage actresses
Puerto Rican telenovela actresses
People from Santurce, Puerto Rico
University of Puerto Rico alumni